Motiram Lahane (1922 - 2005) was a politician with Bharatiya Janata Party. He was a member of Rajya Sabha from Maharashtra state during the term 14 December 1978 to 2 April 1980 as Janata Party candidate.

He entered politics as a member of Jana Sangh. He had represented Murtijapur Assembly constituency of Maharashtra State for a term from 1995 to 1999 as a member of BJP. He had earlier lost from that seat in 1978 and 1990 vidhan sabha elections. He was popularly known as Bhausaheb. He was a close associate of former Prime Minister Atal Bihari Vajpayee and former BJP president L K Advani. Motiram Lahane died on 11 March 2005, leaving behind two wives, four sons and three daughters.

References

Rajya Sabha members from Maharashtra
People from Akola district
1922 births
2005 deaths
Bharatiya Jana Sangh politicians
Maharashtra MLAs 1995–1999
Marathi politicians
Bharatiya Janata Party politicians from Maharashtra
Janata Party politicians
Bharatiya Lok Dal politicians